Lieutenant-Colonel Richard Pepper Arden, 3rd Baron Alvanley (8 December 1792 – 24 June 1857) was a British Army officer and peer.

He was the son of Richard Pepper Arden, 1st Baron Alvanley and Anne Dorothea (née Wilbraham-Bootle). As a young man, he was one of a circle of friends surrounding William Wilberforce.

On 19 March 1811, he purchased a cornetcy in the 15th Hussars. Promoted lieutenant on 3 October 1811, he served with the regiment in the Peninsular War from February 1813 to April 1814. Arden fought at the battles of Morales, Vittoria, Orthez and Toulouse and received the service medal for the latter three.

Arden was gazetted a captain in the 2nd Garrison Battalion on 26 April 1815, being unable to afford a captaincy in a cavalry regiment. Placed on half-pay, he later exchanged into the 32nd Regiment of Foot on 8 July 1819. He purchased a commission as major in the 84th Regiment of Foot on 4 October 1822, and an unattached lieutenant-colonelcy on 30 October 1823. On 1 June 1829, he exchanged from half-pay into the Coldstream Guards as a captain and lieutenant-colonel. However, he sold out and retired from the army on 4 June 1829.

He married Lady Arabella Vane, youngest daughter of the 1st Duke of Cleveland, on 24 April 1831. On 16 November 1849 he succeeded to the title of Lord Alvanley on the death of his brother William Arden, 2nd Baron Alvanley. With no son to inherit the title, the Barony of Alvanley became extinct when he died.

References
Notes

Sources

External links

1792 births
1857 deaths
15th The King's Hussars officers
32nd Regiment of Foot officers
84th Regiment of Foot officers
3
British Army personnel of the Napoleonic Wars
Coldstream Guards officers
Younger sons of barons